Paul Morris may refer to:

 Paul Morris (educationalist) (born 1951), educational writer who published an influential work on the Hong Kong School Curriculum in 1998
 Paul Morris (hurler) (born 1990), Irish hurler
 Paul Morris (musician) (born 1959), former keyboardist for Rainbow
 Paul Morris (PA announcer) (born 1938), Canadian PA announcer for the Toronto Maple Leafs
 Paul Morris (producer), American pornography film producer and owner of Treasure Island Media
 Paul Morris (racing driver) (born 1967), Australian V8 Supercar driver
 Paul Morris (professor), English-born New Zealand religious diversity scholar
 Paul Morris (writer) (born 1958), Scottish film writer
 Paul Morris (rugby league, born 1962), Australian rugby league footballer of the 1980s
 Paul Morris (1990s rugby league), Australian rugby league footballer of the 1990s

See also
 Paul Maurice (born 1967), Canadian ice hockey coach